The FIBA Under-18 Women's Americas Championship is the Americas basketball championship for players under 18 years that take place every two years among national teams of the FIBA Americas zone. Before the 2006 edition the tournament was played by under-19 teams. The top four teams qualify for the FIBA Under-19 Women's World Cup.

Summary

Performances by nation

Participation details

See also
 FIBA Under-16 Women's Americas Championship
 FIBA Under-18 Americas Championship

 
Women's basketball competitions in the Americas between national teams
Under-18 basketball competitions between national teams
Recurring sporting events established in 1988